The 1930 All-Big Six Conference football team consists of American football players chosen by various organizations for All-Big Six Conference teams for the 1930 college football season.  The selectors for the 1930 season included the Associated Press (AP).

All-Big Six selections

Ends
 Steve Hokuf, Nebraska (AP-1)
 Hubert Campbell, Missouri (AP-1)
 Arch Stuck, Kansas (AP-2)
 John Van Dyne, Missouri (AP-2)

Tackles
 Hugh Rhea, Nebraska (AP-1)
 Henry Cronkite, Kansas State (AP-1)
 Robert Fields, Oklahoma (AP-2)
 Earl Foy, Kansas (AP-2)

Guards
 Leonard McGirl, Missouri (AP-1)
 Hilary Lee, Oklahoma (AP-1)
 Elmer Greenberg, Nebraska (AP-2)
 George Atkeson, Kansas (AP-2)

Centers
 Charles Smoot, Kansas (AP-1)
 Lawrence Ely, Nebraska (AP-2)

Quarterbacks
 Colonel Mills, Oklahoma (AP-1)
 Guy Warren, Oklahoma (AP-2)

Halfbacks
 James Bausch, Kansas (AP-1)
 Alex Nigro, Kansas State (AP-1)
 Elmer Schaake, Kansas (AP-2)
 Frosty Cox, Kansas (AP-2)

Fullbacks
 Robert Young, Nebraska (AP-1)
 Ormand Beach, Kansas (AP-2)

Key
AP = Associated Press

See also
 1930 College Football All-America Team

References

All-Big Six Conference football team
All-Big Eight Conference football teams